Red Devotion is the first EP released by the Christian Rock band, Ashes Remain. It was released on January 1, 2009. This is also the band's third independent release.

Critical reception 
Rating the EP with 3.5 stars, Stanley Wells states that "while the first two songs on this EP are not as impressive as they could've been, the rest are rather impressive and give a preview to what Ashes Remain would sound like in 2011".

Track listing

Personnel 
 Josh Smith – lead vocals, backing vocals
 Rob Tahan – lead guitar, backing vocals
 Ryan Nalepa – rhythm guitar
 Jon Hively – bass guitar, backing vocals
 Ben Kirk – drums, percussion

References 

Ashes Remain albums
2009 albums